Eurythecta is a genus of moths belonging to the subfamily Tortricinae of the family Tortricidae.

Species
Eurythecta curva Philpott, 1918
Eurythecta eremana (Meyrick, 1885)
Eurythecta leucothrinca Meyrick, 1931
Eurythecta loxias (Meyrick, 1888)
Eurythecta phaeoxyla Meyrick, 1938
Eurythecta robusta (Butler, 1877)
Eurythecta zelaea Meyrick, 1905

See also
List of Tortricidae genera

References

External links
tortricidae.com

Archipini
Tortricidae genera